The 2022 African Handball Champions League is the 43rd edition, organized by the African Handball Confederation, under the auspices of the International Handball Federation, the handball sport governing body. The tournament will be held from the 30 September to 9 October, 2022 in Hammamet and Nabeul in Tunisia.

Draw
The draw took place on 30 August 2022 in Kigali (Rwanda).

Preliminary rounds

Group A

Group B

Knockout stage

Championship bracket

5-8th bracket

Awards

References 

African Handball Champions League
2022 in African handball